Lorne is a seaside town on Louttit Bay in Victoria, Australia. It is situated about the Erskine River and is a popular destination on the Great Ocean Road tourist route. Lorne is in the Surf Coast Shire and at the  had a population of 1,114 but this figure grows during the holiday season.

History 
Prior to British settlement, Lorne was part of the traditional lands of the Gadubanud or King Parrot people of the Cape Otway coast according to Ian Clark, although many popular websites report that the area was occupied by the Kolakngat Aborigines.

Lorne is situated on a bay named after Captain Louttit, who sought shelter there in 1841 while supervising the retrieval of cargo from a nearby shipwreck. The coast was surveyed five years later in 1846.  The first European settler was William Lindsay, a timber-cutter who began felling the area in 1849. The first telegraph arrived in 1859. Subdivision began in 1869 and in 1871 the town was named after the Marquess of Lorne from Argyleshire in Scotland on the occasion of his marriage to Princess Louise, one of Queen Victoria's daughters. The Post Office opened on 29 April 1874.

In 1891, the area was visited by Rudyard Kipling, who was inspired to write the poem Flowers, which includes the lines:

By 1922 the Great Ocean Road was extended to Lorne, making the town much more accessible. The first passenger road service to Geelong was established in 1924 and guesthouses began to appear after 1930. The local fishing industry expanded significantly in the 1930s and 1940s. The Ash Wednesday bushfires swept through the area in 1983, destroying 76 houses.

Lorne Magistrates' Court closed on 1 October 1984.

Tourism 

Popular local activities include traditional beach pursuits such as family bathing and surfing, as well as pier fishing for barracuda, whiting, and trevally. Teddy's Lookout lies at the end of George Street on the town's southern outskirts and offers fine views over the town, coastline, and Great Ocean Road. The Great Otway National Park is nearby; the Erskine River, which rises in the park and contains the Erskine Falls, has its mouth at Lorne.

The town's population swells to around 13,000 each New Year's Eve when the Falls Festival takes place.  During the first weekend of January over 20,000 spectators visit Lorne when the town hosts the 1.2 km Pier to Pub swim (described in the Guinness Book of Records as "the largest organised ocean swim in the world" and currently capped at 4,000 competitors), the 8 km Mountain to Surf run, and the Lorne Surf Boat Race.  Terminating in Lorne on the Queen's Birthday was the Great Otway Classic Foot Race (no longer held).  Fair on the Foreshore occurs on the first weekend in November.

The town has an Australian Rules football team competing in the Colac & District Football League.

Golf and tennis are played at the Lorne Country Club on Holliday Road.

The town has two pubs (The Grand Pacific Hotel and Lorne Hotel) and a number of cafes, restaurants, and bakeries, mostly located along Mountjoy Parade. The town is serviced by one supermarket with a reasonable range of products, given the wide range of needs from locals to camping families to passing motorists. They stock local products such as breads and preserves. Other stores sell more local fruits, vegetables, cheese, and there are bakeries. As usual in a tourist town, there is a large number of boutiques and clothing stores, as well as a book store, art galleries, and craft shops. There are also more regular shops such as real estate agents, a pharmacy, and post office.
Lorne has The Great Ocean Road Museum, which describes the history of the road.

Mobile communications 
Telstra, Optus and Vodafone all have mobile towers in Lorne, providing a decent 3G and 4G signal.

Mobile coverage and speeds may be affected during summertime as Lorne is an extremely popular tourist destination.

Education 
Lorne has one school, Lorne P-12 College, that facilitates both primary and secondary education.

Climate
Lorne has an oceanic climate (Cfb) with mild summers and cool, damp winters.

Heritage listed sites

Lorne contains a number of heritage listed sites, including:

 35 Mountjoy Parade, Erskine House
 Great Ocean Road
 242-244 Mountjoy Parade, Jura
 222 Mountjoy Parade, Leighwood
 76-80 Mountjoy Parade, Lorne Cinema
 18 Smith Street and 15 Grove Road, Lorne Primary School

Annual events 
 Pier to Pub
 Falls Festival (New Years)
 Great Ocean Road Marathon
 Lorne Festival of Performing Arts
 Lorne Film
 Lorne Sculpture Biennale
 Schoolies Week
 Swing Bridge Model Boat Regatta
Caulfield Cup Punting Bonanza

Notable people 
 Rod Sims (born 1950), chair of the Australian Competition & Consumer Commission (ACCC)
 Jack Steven (born 1990), former AFL footballer at the St Kilda and Geelong football clubs.

Gallery

References

External links

 Lorne Tourist Information
 Great Ocean Road info
 Lorne Visitor Guide - Lorne.com.au

Towns in Victoria (Australia)
Surf Coast Shire
Coastal towns in Victoria (Australia)
Seaside resorts in Australia
Western District (Victoria)